Wesley Stoker Barker Woolhouse (6 May 1809 – 12 August 1893) was an English actuary with diverse interests in music theory, the design of steam locomotives, measurements, and many other fields, publishing books in all these fields.

Biography
He was born in North Shields, England, and at the age of thirteen won a mathematical prize offered by The Ladies' Diary, competing against the adult competition.

From 1830 to 1837 he was Deputy Secretary of the Nautical Almanac. In 1844 he became editor of The Lady's and Gentleman's Diary, and continued in this role until 1865. A problem he published in The Lady's and Gentleman's Diary was the inspiration for Thomas Kirkman to publish his first mathematical work, on Kirkman's schoolgirl problem, beginning the mathematical study of combinatorial designs.

His book, Essays on Musical Intervals, Harmonics, and the Temperament of the Musical Scale, advocated 19-tone equal temperament and used a division of the octave into 730 parts, now designated as Woolhouse units, for measuring musical intervals.

He is credited with a formula for numerical integration.

In 1848 he was a co-founder of the Institute of Actuaries.

He died on 12 August 1893 and was buried in a family grave on the western side of Highgate Cemetery.

His daughter, Emma Mary (Woolhouse) Rea, married musician Dr. William Rea of Newcastle upon Tyne, England.

Books
An Elementary Treatise on the application of the Algebraic Analysis to Geometry (1831)
Essays on Musical Intervals, Harmonics, and the Temperament of the Musical Scale (1835) (summarized on, reprinted as )
Investigation of Mortality in the Indian Army, (1839)
Elements of the Differential Calculus (1852)
The Measures, Weights and Moneys of All Nations: and an Analysis of the Christian, Hebrew And Mahometan Calendars (1856) (reprinted as )
On Interpolation, Summation, and the Adjustment of Numerical Tables, (1865)

Notes and references

External links

British actuaries
British music theorists
1809 births
1893 deaths
Burials at Highgate Cemetery
People from North Shields
19th-century British businesspeople
19th-century musicologists